Sphingonotus lluciapomaresi, the Iberian sand Grasshopper, is a species of band-winged grasshopper in the family Acrididae. It is found on the Iberian Peninsula.

The IUCN conservation status of Sphingonotus lluciapomaresi is "LC", least concern, with no immediate threat to the species' survival. The IUCN status was assessed in 2015.

References

External links

 

Oedipodinae